Samuel Baker House may refer to

 Samuel Baker House (Elfers, Florida), listed on the NRHP in Florida
 Samuel Baker House (Mendon, Utah), listed on the NRHP in Utah